Rubens (1805 – February 1829) was a British Thoroughbred racehorse. During his career he won three races, including the Craven Stakes in 1810. After retiring from racing he became a successful stallion and was the leading sire in Great Britain and Ireland in 1815, 1821 and 1822. His progeny included Landscape, Pastille, Whizgig and the Rubens mare.

Background
Rubens was a chestnut colt bred by the Prince of Wales and foaled in 1805. His dam was the bay Alexander mare who also foaled Castrel, Craven Stakes winner Selim and Epsom Oaks winner Bronze. All three of these foals were full-siblings to Rubens. Their sire was dual Craven Stakes winner Buzzard. As well as these siblings, Buzzard also sired St. Leger Stakes winner Quiz.

Racing career

1808: Three-year-old season
On 2 June 1808 at Epsom Downs and racing for the Prince of Wales, Rubens started as the 10/3 second favourite for the Derby where he face nine rivals. The race was won by 25/1 outsider Pan, who beat the favourite Vandyke. Chester finished in third place, with Rubens in fourth. Rubens was then purchased by 3rd Earl of Darlington and at Brighton in August he was one of four horses who contested the Pavilion Stakes. Derby runner-up Vandyke was the 5/6 favourite, with Rubens second favourite at 3/1. Rubens won the race from Vandyke. He was also intended to run in four match races during the season, but his opponents in each of these paid a forfeit and the races never took place. The forfeits were from Bradbury, a colt by Gohanna, Dreadnought and Jock.

1809: Four-year-old season
In April 1809 at the Newmarket First Spring meeting he won a Sweepstakes of 100 guineas each over one mile, after starting as the 4/7 favourite. Chester was second and Zoroaster finished in third place of the five runners. The following month he lost to Vandyke in a 200 guineas match race at Newmarket. In October he was intended to race against Oaks winner Morel at Newmarket, but Darlington paid a forfeit. Three days later he also paid a forfeit to Currycomb.

1810: Five-year-old season
On 23 April 1810 he beat odds on favourite Plover to win the Craven Stakes at Newmarket. A colt by Dick Andrews finished last of the three runners. Runens' final race was in a Handicap Sweepstakes of 200 guineas each at Newmarket in May. He finished the race in third, behind winner Spaniard and runner-up Cecilia. Rubens was then sold to General Leveson Gower and retired to stud.

Stud career
Rubens was a stallion at Wokingham in Berkshire, where in 1811, he stood for an initial fee of twelve guineas and one guineas for the groom. In 1818 he moved to Newmarket and his fee was 25 guineas. He stood in or around Newmarket for a number of years, but in between he stood at Eaton Stud near Chester in 1820.

He was a successful stallion and was the Leading sire in Great Britain and Ireland in 1815, 1821 and 1822. His progeny included Epsom Oaks winners Landscape and Pastille and 1000 Guineas winner Whizgig. He was also the damsire of Epsom Derby winners Coronation, Dangerous and Phosphorus. His unnamed daughter, the 1819 Rubens mare, was the dam of Phosphorus and two other classic winners. Rubens died in February 1829.

Pedigree

* Rubens was inbred 3x4 to Herod. This means that the stallion appears once in the third generation and once in the fourth generation of his pedigree.

Sire line tree

Rubens
Raphael
Bobadil
Gainsborough
Sovereign
Strephon
Doctor Eady
Tandem
Taniers
Peter Lely
Poussin
Titian
Holbein
Wiseacre
Roderick
Sir Edward Codrington

References

1805 racehorse births
1829 racehorse deaths
British Champion Thoroughbred Sires
Racehorses bred in the United Kingdom
Racehorses trained in the United Kingdom
Thoroughbred family 2-n